The 2018 Lombard regional election took place on 4 March 2018.

The election took place concurrently with the Italian general election and the Lazio regional election.

Electoral system
Since 2012, Lombardy has adopted its own legislation to elect its Council, very similar to national Tatarella Law of 1995.

While the President of Lombardy and the leader of the opposition are still elected at-large, 78 councilors are elected by party lists under a form of semi-proportional representation. The winning coalition receives a jackpot of at least 45 seats, which are divided between all majority parties using the D'Hondt method, as it happens between the losing lists. Each party then distributes its seats to its provincial lists, where candidates are openly selected.

According to the Law 17 February 1968, no. 108, the Regional Council is elected every five years. The election can take place since the fourth Sunday before the completion of this five years period.

Campaign
On 1 March 2016, President Maroni announced his intention to run for a re-election as president. Nonetheless, on 8 January 2018 he announced he'd not seek a re-election as president, citing personal reasons and launching former mayor of Varese Attilio Fontana as candidate of the center-right coalition.

On 1 June 2017 Giorgio Gori, the incumbent mayor of Bergamo, announced his decision to run for the presidency for the center-left coalition.

On 15 January 2018, Fontana stated that the white race and the Western culture were in danger due to the migration flows from Africa. This created lot of protests and criticisms from the centre-left Democratic Party and also the anti-establishment Five Star Movement.

Parties and candidates

Results

According to the final results, Attilio Fontana was the new President of Lombardy with more than 49% of the votes, obtaining the greater bonus given by the electoral law.

Results by province

Results by capital city

Seats by province

References

2018 elections in Italy
21st century in Lombardy
Regional elections in Lombardy
March 2018 events in Italy